The Honda Beat is a rear wheel drive, mid-engined two-seat roadster kei car produced from May 1991 until February 1996. The Beat was the last car to be approved by Soichiro Honda before he died in 1991. The total number of cars produced was around 33,600. Most of the production (around two-thirds) occurred in the first year, and then production and sales fell drastically. The design of the car originated from Pininfarina, who then sold the design plan to Honda. The Beat was one of many cars designed to take advantage of Japan's tax-efficient kei car class.

History
There were two mainstream models of the Beat (the PP1–100 and the PP1–110) and a couple of limited edition versions. Variations on the first model were just cosmetic updates. Only the second model had any real mechanical differences. All cars were offered with the option of a driver's side airbag. The car was sold exclusively in Japan at Honda Primo dealership sales channels. 

In typical Honda fashion, the Beat's engine did not utilize a turbocharger or supercharger. The  engine was modified with the MTREC (Multi Throttle Responsive Engine Control) system, with individual throttle bodies for each of the three cylinders, to produce  at 8100 rpm with an electronically limited top speed of 135 km/h (84 mph). Only a manual transmission was available. The MTREC design would filter down to the 1993 Honda Today kei car.

The Beat was part of a wave of kei car-sized sports cars in the early 1990s; its competitors included the Suzuki Cappuccino and Mazda's Autozam AZ-1. Together they anticipated the arrival of the Smart Roadster over a decade later, while Japan would not see a new model of the genre until the 2002 Daihatsu Copen.

On May 9, 2010, a parade was held in the Twin Ring Motegi circuit as a part of an annual Beat owners meeting. 569 Honda Beats participated in the parade, which is certified by Guinness World Records as the largest parade of Honda cars. The record was shown in the 2011 edition of Guinness World Records.

Versions

Various versions:
Standard Equipment:
air conditioning, power windows, 3-point seat belt, sun visor, front stabilizer, front laminated glass, side-toughened glass, halogen head lamps, soft top, steel wheels.

1992.02: The Beat Version F features the Aztec Green Pearl color and alloy wheels.
1992.05: The Beat Version C features the Captiva Blue Pearl color and white alloy wheels.
1993.05: The Beat Version Z features the Blade Silver Metallic color or Evergrade Green Metallic color, three black gauges, mud guards, a rear spoiler, exhaust pipe finisher, and alloy wheels.

Successor

In 2015, the Honda S660 was released. It is a spiritual successor to the Beat, sharing the Beat's 2 door roadster body style, Kei car classification and rear mid-engine, rear-wheel-drive layout.

Media appearances
The car has been featured on the popular British television program Top Gear together with the Daihatsu Mira and the Mitsubishi Minica Dangan where it was praised by Jeremy Clarkson also on the American television program MotorWeek where it was driven through Southern California. In late 2019, the car was reviewed by the comedic automotive review channel RegularCars on YouTube.

The car is also featured in Gran Turismo 2 (Mugen tuned), Sega GT, Gran Turismo 4, Enthusia Professional Racing, Gran Turismo PSP, Gran Turismo 5, Gran Turismo 6, Gran Turismo Sport, Gran Turismo 7, and alongside many of its kei sports car contemporaries in Kat's Run: Zen-Nippon K Car Senshuken for the Super Famicom.

References

External links

Honda Beat Specifications via Kei Cars
Information from Honda 
More Specifications on UK owners club

Beat
Kei cars
Rear mid-engine, rear-wheel-drive vehicles
Cars introduced in 1991
Roadsters